The following notable mountains and mountain ranges are completely or partially within the borders of Ethiopia:



A 
Mount Abba Yared • Abul Kasim (mountain) • Mount Abuna Yosef • Mount Abuye Meda • Amba Alagi • Ale Bagu • Mount Amara • Amaro Mountains • Mount Ambaricho • Mount Amedamit • Amba Aradam • Mount Assimba • Mount Ayalu

B 
Bale Mountains • Mount Bambasi • Mount Batu • Mount Belaya • Mount Biuat • Borale Ale • Borawli

C 
Mount Chilalo • Mount Choqa • Choqa Mountains

D 
Mount Damota Dangur range • Mount Dara Tiniro • Mount Darkeena • Debre Damo • Mount Delo • Mount Dendi

E 
Entoto Mountains • Mount Entoto • Mount Erer
• Erta Ale Range • Ethiopian Highlands

F 
Mount Fentale • Mount Amba Ferit • Mount Fota • Mount Furi

G 
Gada Ale • Mount Gara Muleta • Mount Gardolla • Mount Garochan • Mount Gaysay • Amba Geshen • Mount Gugu • Mount Guna • Mount Gurage

H 
Mount Hai • Hayli Gubbi • Mount Holla

K 
Mount Kaka • Kulibi • Kundudo

M 
Mount Maigudo • Mount Megezez • Mount Mengesha • Mount Meseraia

R 
Ras Dashen

S 
Semien Mountains • Mount Selki • Mount Smith Mount Suluta

T 
Mount Tabala • Tat Ali • Tat Ali Range • Mount Tuka • Mount Tullu Demtu

W 
Mount Wechacha • Wehni • Mount Welel • Mount Wenchi

Y 
Mount Yerer

Z 
Mount Zuqualla

See also 
 Amba (geology)
 List of volcanoes in Ethiopia
 List of highest mountain peaks of Africa, with data on the 47 highest mountains of Ethiopia

Mountains
Ethiopia
 
Ethiopia